Pultenaea daphnoides, commonly known as large-leaf bush-pea or large-leaf bitter-pea, is a species of flowering plant in the family Fabaceae and is endemic to south-eastern Australia. It is an erect shrub with egg-shaped to wedge-shaped leaves with a pointed tip, and dense clusters of bright yellow and red flowers.

Description

Taxonomy and naming
Pultenaea daphnoides was first formally described in 1798 by German botanist Johann Christoph Wendland in 1798 in his book, Botanische Beobachtungen. The specific epithet (daphnoides) means "Daphne-like".

Distribution and habitat
This pultenaea grows in heath and forest from south-east Queensland, along the coast and tablelands of New South Wales, to Victoria where it is widespread and common except in the north-east of that state and Tasmania where it is also widespread and common. It also occurs in the south-east of South Australia, including on Kangaroo Island.

Use in horticulture
Large-leaf bush-pea is a hardy, ornamental shrub and is useful as a feature plant or in an informal hedge, but should not be planted within  of a sewer main.

References

daphnoides
Fabales of Australia
Flora of New South Wales
Flora of Queensland
Flora of South Australia
Flora of Tasmania
Flora of Victoria (Australia)
Taxa named by Johann Christoph Wendland
Plants described in 1798